Sunü is an ancient Chinese goddess associated with music and sexuality. She is viewed as the divine sister of the Chinese war and sex goddess Jiutian Xuannü. She is traditionally portrayed as a highly skilled singer who plays a zither, and Sunü's songs were known for their ability to pacify wild animals, inspire plants to grow, as well as change the seasons. "When she plays... it can make the wind warm in winter, snow in summer..." In the History of Chinese Literature (中国文学史), Sunü is imagined as the first female harp player.

As goddess of sexuality, Sunü was said to share sexual expertise with the Yellow Emperor and is said to have authored Su Nü Jing, the basic book of Taoist sexology.

Etymology 
In earlier periods, the goddess was known as simply Sunü. The name has been variously translated as the "Immaculate Lady," "Immaculate Maiden," the "Pure Girl," or the "White Madam" in English. In the late Ming and early Qing dynasties, the author  created the title Jiutian Sunü (九天素女), adding "[of the] Nine Heavens", to refer to the goddess.

She is closely related to Xuannü, who is her divine sister. Both their names combined, as xuansu zhidao, signify the Daoist arts of the bedchamber.

Legends
According to the Classic of Mountains and Seas, Sunü lived in the region of Guangdu (or Duguang, corresponding to Shuangliu, near Chengdu, Sichuan) in the region of the Heishui, close to the tomb of Hou Ji.

As recounted in the earliest Chinese encyclopedia Shiben, Fuxi was the creator of the zither (se or qin). The story as told is that there were three goddesses in the era of Huangdi (the Yellow Emperor), namely Sunü ("the Simple Woman"), Xuannü ("the Mysterious Woman"), and Cainü ("the Colorful Woman"); the three sisters taught the Huangdi Taoist sexual practices, the theory of sex, and physically practiced the teachings with him. Among the three, Sunü was the best at music. Since Sunü was the best musician, Huangdi sent her to play the zither. When she was not able to master the fifty-string instrument, she divided it into two parts - each with twenty-five strings.

References

Chinese goddesses
Love and lust goddesses
Health goddesses